Finnfjordbotn, popularly known as Finnsnes Øst, is a village in Senja Municipality in Troms og Finnmark county, Norway. The district, which has approx. 600 inhabitants (with Finnfjord 783 inhabitants, 2009), includes some housing estates from the 1970s and 1980s, but it is especially the industry that is dominant.

Finnfjord smelter is located in Finnfjordbotn and produces approximately 100,000 tonnes of ferrosilicon a year.

References

Villages in Troms
Lenvik
Populated places of Arctic Norway
Senja